"The Color Violet" is a song by Canadian rapper Tory Lanez. It is the fourth track on his sixth studio album Alone at Prom, which was released on December 10, 2021 by One Umbrella. The song is heavily inspired by '80s aesthetics and was written and produced by Nik Dean. Commercially, "The Color Violet" became a sleeper hit after going viral on TikTok.

Commercial performance 
Following the song going viral, the song became a minor hit in some countries, debuting at number 99 on the UK Singles Chart on November 25, 2022. The song additionally reached number 63 on the US Billboard Hot 100 and number 24 on the Canadian Hot 100.

Charts

Certifications

References 

2021 songs
Tory Lanez songs